Olearia microphylla, commonly known as snow bush, small-leaved daisy-bush or twiggy daisy-bush, is a species of flowering plant in the family Asteraceae and is endemic to eastern Australia. It is a shrub with spatula-shaped leaves with the edges rolled under, and white and yellow, daisy-like inflorescences.

Description
Each head has six to eight white ray florets surrounding four to eight yellow disc florets. Flowering occurs from June to October and the fruit is a glandular achene, the pappus with 32 to 47 bristles.

Taxonomy
Snow bush was first formally described in 1804 by Étienne Pierre Ventenat who gave it the name Aster microphyllus in his book Jardin de la Malmaison. In 1916, Joseph Maiden and Ernst Betche changed the name to Olearia microphylla in A Census of New South Wales Plants. The specific epithet (microphylla) means "small-leaved".

Distribution and habitat
Olearia microphylla is widespread from south-eastern Queensland through eastern New South Wales and the Australian Capital Territory and as far south as the Queanbeyan district, growing in shrubland, heath and sclerophyll forest, where it is associated with such species as Eucalyptus sieberi and Eucalyptus sclerophylla.

References

microphylla
Asterales of Australia
Flora of New South Wales
Flora of Queensland
Plants described in 1860
Taxa named by Étienne Pierre Ventenat